Boletellus floriformis is a species of bolete fungus in the family Boletaceae. Found in Japan, it was described as new to science by Rokuya Imazeki in 1952.

References

External links

Fungi described in 1952
Fungi of Asia
floriformis